Bangall may refer to:

 Bangall, Queensland, a locality in the Barcaldine Region in Australia
 Bangall, New York, a hamlet in the United States of America